Lisette Lapointe (born September 13, 1943 in Montreal, Quebec) is a Quebec politician, journalist and teacher, who sat in the Quebec National Assembly first as a Parti Québécois MNA and then as an Independent. She is now mayor of Saint-Adolphe D'Howard. She is the widow of Jacques Parizeau, former Premier of Quebec, Canada. She was first elected to  the National Assembly of Quebec as a candidate for the Parti Québécois in the provincial riding of Crémazie in the 2007 general election.

Prior to her entry into politics, following in the footsteps of her husband, Lapointe worked as a teacher at the secondary level. She was also the director of a health and safety organization in the automobile industry, a journalist at a Mascouche newspaper and was the political aide for the Minister of Social Development and the former MNA of L'Assomption.

After the 2007 elections, she was named on April 25, 2007 the PQ's critic in employment and social solidarity.

On June 6, 2011, Lapointe and caucus mates Louise Beaudoin and Pierre Curzi resigned from the Parti Québécois to sit as independents over the PQ's acceptance of a bill changing the law to permit an agreement between the City of Québec and Quebecor Inc. concerning the construction of an arena in Quebec City. In November 2011, several media outlets reported that she joined the new sovereigntist party Option nationale, led by fellow former PQ caucus member Jean-Martin Aussant. However, while she has bought a membership card from the party, she also retained her membership in the Parti Québécois, and continued to sit as an independent.

On March 4, 2012 she announced that she would not run for re-election and left the National Assembly at the September 2012 provincial election.

References

External links
 

1943 births
Canadian newspaper journalists
Canadian women journalists
Journalists from Montreal
French Quebecers
Independent MNAs in Quebec
Living people
Parti Québécois MNAs
Politicians from Montreal
Writers from Montreal
Women MNAs in Quebec
21st-century Canadian politicians
21st-century Canadian women politicians
Canadian women non-fiction writers